Carolyne Wright (born in 1949, in Bellingham, Washington) is an American poet.

Life
She studied at Seattle University, New York University, and graduated from Syracuse University with master's and doctoral degrees.

She has held visiting creative writing posts at Radcliffe College, Sweet Briar College, Emory University, University of Wyoming, University of Miami, Oklahoma State University, University of Central Oklahoma, University of Oklahoma, The College of Wooster, and Cleveland State University.

She is translation editor of Artful Dodge.  Her work appeared in AGNI, Artful Dodge, Hotel Amerika, Hunger Mountain, Iowa Review, Michigan Quarterly Review, New England Review, New Orleans Review, North American Review, Poetry, Poets & Writers, Southern Review.

From 2004 to 2008, she served on the board of directors of the Association of Writers & Writing Programs (AWP). 
Since 2005, she teaches at the Whidbey Writers Workshop.
In 2008, she is Thornton Poet in Residence at Lynchburg College, and Distinguished Northwest Poet at Seattle University. 
She lives in Seattle.

Awards
 Writing Fellow at the Fine Arts Work Center
 Vermont Studio Center Fellowship
 Yaddo Fellowship
 Fulbright Study Grant in Chile, during the presidency of Salvador Allende
 Indo-U.S. Subcommission and Fulbright Senior Research fellowships in Calcutta and Dhaka, Bangladesh
 Witter Bynner Foundation Grant, for A Bouquet of Roses on the Burning Ground
 NEA Fellowship in Translation, for A Bouquet of Roses on the Burning Ground
 Bunting Institute of Radcliffe College Fellowship, for A Bouquet of Roses on the Burning Ground
 Alice Fay di Castagnola Award from the Poetry Society of America, for A Change of Maps'
 2007 Independent Book Publishers Bronze Award for Poetry, for A Change of Maps Blue Lynx Prize
 Oklahoma Book Award in Poetry
 2001 American Book Award from the Before Columbus Foundation.
 PEN/Jerard Fund Award and the Crossing Boundaries Award from International Quarterly for The Road to Isla NegraWorks
 A Change of Maps (Lost Horse Press, 2006),
   (2nd edition 2005)
  (AWP Award Series)
 , an invitational chapbook
 
 A Choice of Fidelities: Lectures and Readings from a Writer's Life (Ashland Poetry Press)

Anthologies
 
 A Bouquet of Roses on the Burning GroundMemoir
 The Road to Isla Negra''

Translations
"House", NABANEETA DEV SEN, Blackbird, Fall 2009
"Mysteries of Memory", NABANEETA DEV SEN, Blackbird, Fall 2009

References

Writers from Seattle
Seattle University alumni
New York University alumni
Syracuse University alumni
Radcliffe fellows
Cleveland State University faculty
Sweet Briar College faculty
University of Wyoming faculty
Living people
American women poets
American Book Award winners
1949 births
American women academics
21st-century American women